The Citadel Theatre is the major theatre-arts venue in Edmonton, the capital city of Alberta, Canada. This is a chronological list of the productions staged there since its opening night on November 10, 1965.

1965–1966
Who's Afraid of Virginia Woolf? – by Edward Albee
Under the Yum-Yum Tree – by Lawrence Roman
Bell, Book and Candle – by John Van Druten
Come Back, Little Sheba – by William Inge
Never Too Late – by S. A. Long
Death of a Salesman – by Arthur Miller
Come Blow Your Horn – by Neil Simon
The Glass Menagerie – by Tennessee Williams

1966–1967
The Pleasure of His Company – by Cornelia Otis Skinner and Samuel A. Taylor
The Threepenny Opera – by Bertolt Brecht and Kurt Weill
All The Crazy Things That Crazy People Do – by Robert Glenn and Raymond Allen
The Little Hut – by André Roussin
Candida – by George Bernard Shaw
The Subject Was Roses – by Frank D. Gilroy
Luv – by Murray Schisgal

1967–1968
Barefoot in the Park – by Neil Simon
Hedda Gabler – by Henrik Ibsen
A Funny Thing Happened on the Way to the Forum – music and lyrics by Stephen Sondheim, book by Burt Shevelove and Larry Gelbart
Tiny Alice – by Edward Albee
The Owl and the Pussycat – by Bill Manhoff
Hamp – by John Wilson
Private Lives – by Noël Coward

1968–1969
The Odd Couple – by Neil Simon
Philadelphia Here I Come! – by Brian Friel
Irma La Douce – music by Marguerite Monnot, lyrics and book by Alexandre Breffort
The Right Honourable Gentleman – by Michael Dyne
Village Wooing / Dark Lady of the Sonnets – by George Bernard Shaw
In White America – by Martin Duberman
Star Spangled Girl – by Neil Simon

1969–1970
There's A Girl In My Soup – by Terence Frisby
The Rehearsal – by Jean Anouilh
The Fantasticks – music by Harvey Schmidt, lyrics by Tom Jones
The Shadow of a Gunman – by Seán O'Casey
The Price – by Arthur Miller
Lovers – by Brian Friel
Seidman & Son – by Elick Moll

1970–1971
The Importance of Being Earnest – by Oscar Wilde
Staircase – by Charles Dyer
The Secretary Bird – by William Douglas-Home
Plaza Suite – by Neil Simon
Othello – by William Shakespeare
Counsellor Extraordinary – by Stewart Boston
Lullaby – by Don Appell

1971–1972
Blithe Spirit – by Noël Coward
The Quare Fellow – by Brendan Behan
Don't Listen Ladies! – by Guy Bolton and P G Wodehouse (adapted from a play by Sacha Guitry)
Of Mice and Men – by John Steinbeck
The Affairs of Anatol – by Arthur Schnitzler
An Enemy of the People – by Henrik Ibsen
Yesterday the Children were Dancing – by Gratien Gélinas

1972–1973
Last of the Red Hot Lovers – by Neil Simon
The V.P. – by Alexander McAllister
You're a Good Man, Charlie Brown – music and lyrics by Clark Gesner, book by John Gordon
The Unreasonable Act of Julian Waterman – by Ron Taylor
The Tempest – by William Shakespeare
Jacques Brel Is Alive and Well and Living in Paris – by Jacques Brel
Relatively Speaking – by Alan Ayckbourn

1973–1974
Much Ado About Nothing – by William Shakespeare
The Caretaker – by Harold Pinter
I Do! I Do! – book and lyrics by Tom Jones, music by Harvey Schmidt
Childs Play – by Robert Marasco
How the Other Half Loves – by Alan Ayckbourn
That Championship Season – by Jason Miller
Oedipus Rex / Scapini (double bill) – by Sophocles and Molière

1974–1975
The Rivals – by Richard Brinsley Sheridan
6 RMS RIV VU – by Bob Randall
Anything Goes – by Cole Porter
The Au Pair Man – by Hugh Leonard
Uncle Vanya – by Anton Chekhov
Forever Yours, Marie-Lou – by Michel Tremblay
The Alchemist – by Ben Jonson
Babel Rap – by John Lazarus Scott
The Extermination of Jesus Christ – by George Bernard Shaw
Battering Ram – by David Freeman

1975–1976
Sherlock Holmes – by Arthur Conan Doyle
Dear Liar – by Jerome Kilty
Joseph and the Amazing Technicolor Dreamcoat – by Andrew Lloyd Webber and Tim Rice
The Sunshine Boys – by Neil Simon
Mrs. Warren's Profession – by George Bernard Shaw
Absurd Person Singular – by Alan Ayckbourn
A Compulsory Option – by Sharon Pollock
Hosanna – by Michel Tremblay
Endgame – by Samuel Beckett
You're Gonna be Alright, Jamie Boy – by David Freeman
Olympiad – by Patrick Rose and Richard Ouzounian

1976–1977
Romeo and Juliet – by William Shakespeare
Equus – by Peter Shaffer
Oh, Coward! – by Noël Coward
Schweik in the Second World War – by Bertolt Brecht
Bethune – by Rod Langley
Same Time, Next Year – by Bernard Slade
The Master Builder – by Henrik Ibsen
Crabdance – by Beverley Simons
The Komagata Maru Incident – by Sharon Pollock

1977–1978
Happy Days – by Samuel Beckett
Bedroom Farce – by Alan Ayckbourn
Pygmalion – by George Bernard Shaw
Twelfth Night – by William Shakespeare
The Night of the Iguana – by Tennessee Williams
Dames at Sea – book and lyrics by George Haimsohn and Robin Miller, music by Jim Wise
Antigone – by Jean Anouilh
Boiler Room Suite – by Rex Deverell
Passengers – by Paddy Campbell, music by William Skolnik
Ashes – by David Rudkin
The Lover – by Harold Pinter
The Stronger – by August Strindberg
Solange – by Jean Barbeau
Treasure Island – by Robert Louis Stevenson

1978–1979
Harold and Maude – by Colin Higgins
Richard III – by William Shakespeare
Flowers for Algernon – by Daniel Keyes
Cause Célèbre – by Terence Rattigan
Charley's Aunt – by Brandon Thomas
Ecstasy of Rita Joe – by George Ryga
Moby Dick - Rehearsed – by Orson Welles
Rashomon – by Fay Kanin and Michael Kanin
API 2967 – by Robert Gurik
The Chairs and the New Tenant – by Eugène Ionesco
A Bistro Car on the CNR – by Richard Ouzounian
Storytheatre – by Peter Coe
Songs and Stories of A. A. Milne – by A. A. Milne

1979–1980
Hamlet – by William Shakespeare
Brief Lives – by Patrick Garland
The Trials of Oscar Wilde – by Peter Coe
Hey Marilyn – by Cliff Jones
One Tiger to a Hill – by Sharon Pollock
Arms and the Man – by George Bernard Shaw
Mister Lincoln – by Herbert Mitgang
A Sleep of Prisoners – by Christopher Fry
The Trojan Women – by Euripides
Billy Bishop Goes to War – by John Gray and Eric Peterson
Macbeth – by William Shakespeare
Christmas in the Market Place – by Henri Ghéon
Pinocchio – by Brian Way

1980–1981
A Life – by Hugh Leonard
Ballerina – by Arne Skouen
A Flea in Her Ear – by Georges Feydeau
Whose Life Is It Anyway? – by Brian Clark
The Miser – by Molière
Grease – by Jim Jacobs and Warren Casey
Groucho at Large – by Alex Baron
Love in the Back Seat – by Cliff Jones
Servant of Two Masters – by Carlo Goldoni
A Day in the Death of Joe Egg – by Peter Nichols
The Hollow Crown – by John Barton
The Ant and the Grasshopper – by Rob Dearborn
Sleeping Beauty – by James Iwasuk
The Red Shoes – by Robin Short

1981–1982
Catholics – by Brian Moore
The Kite – by W. O. Mitchell
The Boy Friend – by Sandy Wilson
The Comedy of Errors – by William Shakespeare
The Elephant Man – by Bernard Pomerance
56 Duncan Terrace – by Keith Baxter
Talley's Folly – by Lanford Wilson
Tom Foolery – by Tom Lehrer
Inadmissible Evidence – by John Osborne
The Lion in Winter – by James Goldman
Nurse Jane Goes to Hawaii – by Allan Stratton
The Hobbit – by J. R. R. Tolkien
Cinderella – by James de Felice

1982–1983
The Dresser – by Ronald Harwood
The Black Bonspiel of Wullie MacCrimmon – by W. O. Mitchell
The Three Musketeers – by Alexandre Dumas
Murder Game – by Dan Ross
Crimes of the Heart – by Beth Henley
Guys and Dolls – music and lyrics by Frank Loesser, book by Jo Swerling and Abe Burrows
The Gin Game – by D. L. Coburn
Entertaining Mr Sloane – by Joe Orton
Henry IV, Part 1 – by William Shakespeare
Emlyn Williams as Charles Dickens – by Emlyn Williams
Invitation from the Asylum – by Roger O. Hirson
Rapunzel and the Witch – by Jack A. Melanos
Androcles and the Lion – by Aurand Harris

1983–1984
The Lark – by Jean Anouilh
Educating Rita – by Willy Russell
King Lear – by William Shakespeare
Death of a Salesman – by Arthur Miller
Amadeus – by Peter Shaffer
Duddy – by Mordecai Richler, music by Jerry Leiber and Mike Stoller
How I Got That Story – by Amlin Gray
The Fox – by Allan Miller
Talking Dirty – by Sherman Snukal
Gale Garnett and Company – by Gale Garnett
Nuts – by Tom Topor
A Circus Adventure – by James Ambrose Brown
Beauty and the Beast – by Warren Graves

1984–1985
Country Holiday – by Carlo Goldino
Peter Pan – by J. M. Barrie
The Real Thing – by Tom Stoppard
Mephisto – by Klaus Mann and Ariane Mnouchkine
Long Day's Journey Into Night – by Eugene O'Neill
Noises Off – by Michael Frayn
Nineteen Eighty-Four – by George Orwell
Glengarry Glen Ross – by David Mamet
Exposures – by William Chadwick
"Master Harold"...and the Boys – by Athol Fugard
Clay – by Peter Whelan
The Glass Menagerie – by Tennessee Williams
The Promise – by Aleksei Arbuzov
The Mystery of the Oak Island Treasure – by Jim Betts

1985–1986
Quiet in the Land – by Anne Chislett
Pieces of Eight – book by Michael Stewart and Mark Bramble, lyrics by Susan Birkenhead, music by Jule Styne
The Tempest – by William Shakespeare
Trafford Tanzi – by Claire Luckham
Top Girls – by Caryl Churchill
Private Lives – by Noël Coward
Master Class – by David Pownall
Salt-Water Moon – by David French
Ain't Misbehavin' – book by Murray Horwitz and Richard Maltby, Jr., music by Fats Waller
Fool for Love – by Sam Shepard
Getting the Nerve – by Becker/Clinton
Winnie-the-Pooh – by A. A. Milne
She Stoops to Conquer – by Oliver Goldsmith
Last Voyage of the Devil's Wheel – by Jim Betts
Doors – by Susan Zeder

1986–1987
Brighton Beach Memoirs – by Neil Simon
Traveller in the Dark – by Marsha Norman
Pride and Prejudice – by Jane Austen
Tsymbaly – by Ted Galay
The Return of Herbert Bracewell – by Andrew Johns
Jerry's Girls – by Jerry Herman
The Double Bass – by Patrick Süskind
Asinamali – by Mbongeni Ngema
Fire – by Paul Ledoux and David Young
Pericles – by William Shakespeare
The Lord of the Rings – by J. R. R. Tolkien
The Wizard of Oz – by L. Frank Baum
The Treehouse at the Edge of the World – by Jim Betts
School Season – by Oliver Goldsmith
The Legend of Sleepy Hollow – by Washington Irving
The Wind in the Willows – by Kenneth Grahame

1987–1988
Hadrian the Seventh – by Peter Luke
Another Season's Promise – by Anne Chislett and Keith Roulston
Biloxi Blues – by Neil Simon
Loot – by Joe Orton
Back to Beulah – by W. O. Mitchell
Broadway Bound – by Neil Simon
Orphans – Lyle Kessler
The Perfect Party – by A. R. Gurney
Nunsense – by Dan Goggin
The Road to Mecca – by Athol Fugard
Annie – music by Charles Strouse, lyrics by Martin Charnin, book by Thomas Meehan
A Christmas Carol – by Charles Dickens
The Prisoner of Zenda – by Warren Graves
Two Pails of Water – by Aad Greidanus
The Prime of Miss Jean Brodie – by J. P. Allen
The Revenge of the Space Pandas – by David Mamet

1988–1989
Dracula – by Hamilton Deane
Major Barbara – by George Bernard Shaw
Three Men on a Horse – by John Cecil Holm and George Abbott
Cecil and Cleopaytra – by Daniel Libman
Nothing Sacred – by George F. Walker
Ma Rainey's Black Bottom – by August Wilson
Burn This – by Lanford Wilson
Kiss of the Spider Woman – by Manuel Puig
Talk Radio – by Eric Bogosian
Angry Housewives – music and lyrics by Chad Henry, book by A. M. Collins
Great Expectations – by Charles Dickens
Aladdin – by Norman Robbins
The Lion, the Witch and the Wardrobe – by C. S. Lewis

1989–1990
A Midsummer Night's Dream – by William Shakespeare
The Crucible – by Arthur Miller
Driving Miss Daisy – by Alfred Uhry
A Walk in the Woods – by Lee Blessing
Breaking the Code – by Hugh Whitemore
The Philadelphia Story – by Philip Barry
The Invention of Poetry – by Paul Quarrington
Speed-the-Plow – by David Mamet
Frankie and Johnny in the Clair de Lune – by Terrence McNally
Kafka's Dick – by Alan Bennett
Julius Caesar – by William Shakespeare
The Miracle Worker – by William Gibson
Bedtimes and Bullies – by Dennis Foon
Jacob Two-Two and the Dinosaur – by Mordecai Richler

1990–1991
Love and Anger – by George F. Walker
The Heidi Chronicles – by Wendy Wasserstein
The Fantasticks – music by Harvey Schmidt, lyrics by Tom Jones
The Cocktail Hour – by A. R. Gurney
Never the Sinner – by John Logan
The Mousetrap – by Agatha Christie
Amigo's Blue Guitar – by Joan MacLeod
The Two-Headed Roommate – by Bruce McCulloch
My Children! My Africa! – by Athol Fugard
The Passion of Narcisse Mondoux – by Gratien Gélinas
Robinson and Crusoe – by Nino d’Introna and Giacomo Ravicchio
One Thousand Cranes – by Colin Thomas
David and Lisa – by James Reach
Alice's Adventures in Wonderland – by Lewis Carroll

1991–1992
Aspects of Love – book and music by Andrew Lloyd Webber, lyrics by Don Black and Charles Hart
The Good Doctor – by Neil Simon
The Affections of May – by Norm Foster
Lend Me a Tenor – by Ken Ludwig
Fallen Angels – by Noël Coward
Oedipus / Black Comedy (double bill) – by Sophocles and Peter Shaffer
Democracy – by John Murrell
Tete-a-Tete – by Ralph Burdman
Warriors – by Michel Garneau
Letter from Wingfield Farm – by Dan Needles
Romeo and Juliet – by William Shakespeare
Head a Tete – by David Craig and Robert Morgan
Robin Hood – by David Wood, Dave Arthur and Toni Arthur
Blueprints from Space – by Mark Leiren-Young
Three Men in a Boat – by Blake Heathcote

1992–1993
The Royal Hunt of the Sun – by Peter Shaffer
Waiting for the Parade – by John Murrell
Man of La Mancha – book by Dale Wasserman, lyrics by Joe Darion, music by Mitch Leigh
La Bête – by David Hirson
The Two of Us – by Michael Frayn
She Stoops to Conquer – by Oliver Goldsmith
Hamlet – by William Shakespeare
As You Like It – by William Shakespeare
Invisible Friends – by Alan Ayckbourn
The Diary of Anne Frank – by Frances Goodrich and Albert Hackett
Alice and Emily – by Eileen Whitfield
Shirley Valentine – by Willy Russell
Hosanna – by Michel Tremblay
Duet for One – by Tom Kempinski

1993–1994
Saint Joan – by George Bernard Shaw
Wait Until Dark – by Frederick Knott
Oliver! – by Lionel Bart
Cyrano de Bergerac – by Edmond Rostand
Oleanna – by David Mamet
Hay Fever – by Noël Coward
Our Town – by Thornton Wilder
Macbeth – by William Shakespeare
Rice Season – by Alan Ayckbourn
Love Letters – by A. R. Gurney
A Stranger to my Paris – by Katherine Beaumont
Life after Latex – by Gale Garnett
Someone Who'll Watch Over Me – by Frank McGuinness

1994–1995
Caesar and Cleopatra – by George Bernard Shaw
The Lay of the Land – by Mel Shapiro
The Music Man – by Meredith Willson
The Cherry Orchard – by Anton Chekhov, translation by John Murrell
The Beggar's Opera – by John Gay
A Man for All Seasons – by Robert Bolt
Richard III – by William Shakespeare
Oh, What a Lovely War! – by Joan Littlewood

1995–1996
Breaking Legs – by Tom Dulack
Later Life – by A. R. Gurney
A Fitting Confusion – by Georges Feydeau
Rough Justice – by Terence Frisby
Fiddler on the Roof – music by Jerry Bock, lyrics by Sheldon Harnick, book by Joseph Stein
Da – by Hugh Leonard
Three Tall Women – by Edward Albee
The River Princess and the Frozen Town – by Stewart Lemoine

1996–1997
Ghosts – by Henrik Ibsen
Travels with My Aunt – by Graham Greene
Angels in America, Part Two: Perestroika – by Tony Kushner
My Fair Lady – book and lyrics by Alan Jay Lerner, music by Frederick Loewe
South of China – by Raymond Storey
The Taming of the Shrew – by William Shakespeare
An Ideal Husband – by Oscar Wilde
Rice Theatre – by Edward Albee
Wingfield's Folly – by Dan Needles
Mata Hari – by Blake Brooker
Primadonna's First Farewell Tour – by Mary Lou Fallis
The Piano Man's Daughter – by Timothy Findley
Songs of Me and Other Little White Lies – by Sheri Somerville
The River Princess and the Frozen Town – by Stewart Lemoine

1997–1998
Suddenly, Last Summer – by Tennessee Williams
Ninguls – by Soh Kuramoto
Othello – by William Shakespeare
Hello, Dolly! – lyrics and music by Jerry Herman, book by Michael Stewart
A Delicate Balance – by Edward Albee
Mrs. Warren's Profession – by George Bernard Shaw
Master Class – by Terrence McNally
Lady, Be Good – written by Guy Bolton, Fred Thompson, music by George Gershwin and Ira Gershwin

1998–1999
Of Mice and Men – by John Steinbeck
How I Learned to Drive – by Paula Vogel
The Great Wingfield Adventure – by Dan Needles
The King and I – by Richard Rodgers and Oscar Hammerstein II
Tartuffe – by Molière
Skylight – by David Hare
Twelfth Night – by William Shakespeare
The Importance of Being Earnest – by Oscar Wilde
Babes in Arms – by Richard Rodgers and Lorenz Hart
Wealth – by Aristophanes

1999–2000
Picasso at the Lapin Agile – by Steve Martin
Popcorn – by Ben Elton
Into the Woods – by Stephen Sondheim and James Lepine
The Aberhart Summer – by Conni Massing
A Streetcar Named Desire – by Tennessee Williams
Little Shop of Horrors – by Howard Ashman and Alan Menken
A Midsummer Night's Dream – by William Shakespeare
2 Pianos, 4 Hands – by Ted Dykstra and Richard Greenblatt

2000–2001
To Kill A Mockingbird – by Harper Lee and Christopher Sergel
Wit's End – by Sandra Shamus
Betty's Summer Vacation – by Christopher Durang
A Christmas Carol – by Charles Dickens
The Number 14 – by Melody Anderson
Wit – by Margaret Edson
Beatrice – by Chancey James Rolfe and George Elliott Clarke
Camelot – by Alan Lerner and Frederick Loewe
Romeo and Juliet – by William Shakespeare
'Art' – by Yasmina Reza

2001–2002
Cabaret – book by Joe Masteroff, lyrics by Fred Ebb, music by John Kander
An Enemy of the People – by Henrik Ibsen
The Beauty Queen of Leenane – by Martin McDonagh
A Christmas Carol – by Charles Dickens
Present Laughter – by Noël Coward
Doing Leonard Cohen – by Blake Brooker
Hamlet – by William Shakespeare
The Drawer Boy – by Michael Healey
Who Has Seen the Wind? – by W. O. Mitchell, adapted by Lee MacDougall

2002–2003
Servant of Two Masters – by Carlo Goldoni
The Actor's Nightmare – by Christopher Durang
Proof – by David Auburn
A Christmas Carol – by Charles Dickens
If We Are Women – by Joanna McClelland Glass
Einstein's Gift – by Vern Thiessen
Homeward Bound – by Elliott Hayes
Grease – by Jim Jacobs and Warren Casey
Paperbag Princesses' Favourite Stories – by Kim McCaw
The Sword in the Stone – by Marty Chan

2003–2004
Arms and the Man – by George Bernard Shaw
Amadeus – by Peter Shaffer
A Christmas Carol – by Charles Dickens
Stones in His Pockets – by Marie Jones
Measure for Measure – by William Shakespeare
Wingfield on Ice – by Dan Needles
The Sound of Music – by Richard Rodgers and Oscar Hammerstein II
The Shape of Things – by Neil LaBute
Blue/Orange – by Joe Penhall
The Syringa Tree – by Pamela Gien
Love You Forever – by Robert Munsch
New Canadian Kid – by Dennis Foon
Where The Wild Things Are – by Maurice Sendak

2004–2005
Cat on a Hot Tin Roof – by Tennessee Williams
Shirley Valentine – by Willy Russell
A Christmas Carol – by Charles Dickens
West Side Story – book by Arthur Laurents, music by Leonard Bernstein, lyrics by Stephen Sondheim
Metamorphoses – by Mary Zimmerman
Uncle Vanya – by Anton Chekhov
Humble Boy – by Charlotte Jones
The Goat, or Who is Sylvia? – by Edward Albee
Shakespeare's Will – by Vern Thiessen
The Mystery of Irma Vep – by Charles Ludlam
A Giraffe in Paris – by Mark Haroun
Munch a Bunch of Munsch – by Kim McCaw

2005–2006
Blithe Spirit – by Noël Coward
Cookin' at the Cookery – by Marion J. Caffey
A Christmas Carol – by Charles Dickens
I Am My Own Wife – by Doug Wright
Guys and Dolls – music and lyrics by Frank Loesser, book by Jo Swerling and Abe Burrows
Trying – by Joanna Glass
Peter Pan – by Tom Wood adapted from the novel by J. M. Barrie
Frozen – by Bryony Lavery
Fully Committed – by Becky Mode
Bigger than Jesus – by Rick Miller and Daniel Brooks
A Year With Frog and Toad – by Arnold Lobel
A Prairie Boy's Winter – by William Kurelek
The Man Whose Mother Was a Pirate – by Margaret Mahy

2006–2007
Equus – by Peter Shaffer
Three Mo' Divas – by Marion J. Caffey
A Christmas Carol – by Charles Dickens
Wingfield's Inferno – by Dan Needles
The Constant Wife – by Somerset Maugham
The Overcoat – by Morris Panych and Wendy Gorling
Oliver! – by Lionel Bart
The Pillowman – by Martin McDonagh
Frida K. – by Gloria Montero
What Lies Before Us – by Morris Panych
Hana's Suitcase – by Karen Levine
Bird Brain – by Albert Wendt
Penelope vs. The Aliens! – by Chris Bullough and Jared Matsunaga-Turnbull

2007–2008
Noises Off – by Michael Frayn
I, Claudia – by Kirsten Thomson
Hana's Suitcase – by Emil Sher
Vimy – by Vern Thiessen
A Christmas Carol – by Charles Dickens
Beauty and the Beast – music by Alan Menken, lyrics by Howard Ashman and Tim Rice, book by Linda Woolverton
Shining City – by Conor McPherson
Macbeth – by William Shakespeare
The December Man – by Colleen Murphy
Half-Life – by John Mighton
Fire – by Paul Ledoux and David Young

2008–2009
Pride and Prejudice – by Jane Austen, adapted by Tom Wood
Billy Twinkle, Requiem for a Golden Boy – by Ronnie Burkett
The Blonde, the Brunette and the Vengeful Redhead – by Robert Hewett
The Forbidden Phoenix – by Marty Chan
A Christmas Carol – by Charles Dickens, adapted by Tom Wood
Scorched – by Wajdi Mouawad
Three Mo' Tenors – by Marion J. Caffey
Julius Caesar – by William Shakespeare
Doubt, a parable – by John Patrick Shanley
Extinction Song – by Ron Jenkins
The Wizard of Oz – by L. Frank Baum

2009–2010
The Drowsy Chaperone – by Bob Martin and Don McKellar
Blackbird – by David Harrower
The Jungle Book – by Rudyard Kipling, adapted by Tracey Power
Rock 'n' Roll – by Tom Stoppard
A Christmas Carol – by Charles Dickens, adapted by Tom Wood
Wingfield's Lost and Found – by Dan Needles
Sweeney Todd: The Demon Barber of Fleet Street – by Hugh Wheeler
Courageous – by Michael Healey
The Glass Menagerie – by Tennessee Williams
The Drowning Girls – by Beth Graham, Charlie Tomlinson and Daniela Vlaskalic
As You Like It – by William Shakespeare
Beauty and the Beast – music by Alan Menken, lyrics by Howard Ashman and Tim Rice, book by Linda Woolverton

2010–2011 
 The Three Musketeers – adaptation by Tom Wood; book by Alexandre Dumas
 Little Women: The Musical – by Allan Knee, based on the book by Louisa May Alcott
 True Love Lives – by Brad Fraser
 A Christmas Carol – adaptation by Tom Wood, based on the book by Charles Dickens
 Rick: The Rick Hansen Story – by Dennis Foon
 Another Home Invasion – by Joan McLeod
 Billy Bishop Goes to War – by John Gray
 Hunchback – by Jonathan Christenson
 Studies in Motion – by Kevin Kerr
 Intimate Apparel – by Lynn Nottage
 August: Osage County – by Tracy Letts

2011-2012 
 Death of a Salesman – by Arthur Miller
 Blind Date – by Rebecca Northan
 A Christmas Carol – adaptation by Tom Wood, based on the book by Charles Dickens
 This is What Happens Next – by Daniel MacIvor
 The Sound of Music – by Howard Lindsay & Russel Crouse
 Red – by John Logan
 Seussical – by Lynn Ahrens & Stephen Flaherty, based on the works of Dr. Seuss
 The Rocky Horror Show – by Richard O’Brien
 Penny Plain – by Ronnie Burkett
 A Midsummer Night’s Dream – by William Shakespeare
 God of Carnage – Yazmina Reza, translated by Christopher Hampton

2012-2013 
 A Few Good Men - by Aaron Sorkin
 Next to Normal - book and lyrics by Brian Yorkey, music by Tom Kitt
A Christmas Carol – by Charles Dickens, adapted by Tom Wood
 Private Lives - by Noël Coward
 Ride the Cyclone - by Jacob Richmond, music by Brooke Maxwell & Jacob Richmond
 The Kite Runner - adapted by Matthew Spangler, based on the novel by Khaled Hosseini
 The Penelopiad - by Margaret Atwood
 Monty Python's Spamalot - book & lyrics by Eric Idle, music by John Du Prez & Eric Idle

2013-2014 
 Long Day's Journey Into Night - by Eugene O’Neill
 2 Pianos 4 Hands - by Ted Dykstra & Richard Greenblatt
 Clybourne Park - by Bruce Norris
 Mary Poppins - by Julian Fellowes
 Romeo and Juliet - by William Shakespeare 
 Make Mine Love - by Tom Wood 
 The Daisy Theatre - by Ronnie Burkett
 A Christmas Carol - Adapted by Tom Wood – Based on the story by Charles Dickens
 Do You Want What I Have Got? A Craigslist Cantata - by Veda Hille and Bill Richardson

2014-2015 
 Kim’s Convenience – by Ins Choi
 The Daisy Theatre – by Ronnie Burkett
 One Man, Two Guvnors – by Richard Bean
 A Christmas Carol – adaptation by Tom Wood, based on the book by Charles Dickens
 Venus in Fur – by David Ives
 Playing with Fire – by Kirstie McLellan Day and Theoren Fleury
 Life, Death and The Blues – by Raoul Bhaneja
 Vigilante – by Jonathan Christenson
 Arcadia – by Tom Stoppard
 Avenue Q – by Jeff Whitty, music and lyrics by Robert Lopez and Jeff Marx

2015-2016 
 BOOM - by Rick Miller
 Evangeline - by Ted Dykstra
 A Christmas Carol – adaptation by Tom Wood, based on the book by Charles Dickens
 Chelsea Hotel - by Tracey Power 
 Who's Afraid of Virginia Woolf - by Edward Albee
 The Gay Heritage Project - by Damien Atkins, Paul Dunn and Andrew Kushnir 
 Alice Through the Looking Glass - by Lewis Carroll, adapted for the stage by James Reaney 
 Other Desert Cities - by Jon Robin Baitz 
 West Side Story - book by Arthur Laurents, music by Leonard Bernstein, lyrics by Stephen Sondheim

2016-2017 
 The Curious Incident of the Dog in the Night Time - by Simon Stephens
 Bittergirl - The Musical - by Annabel Fitzsimmons, Alison Lawrence, and Mary Francis Moore 
 Million Dollar Quartet - by Colin Escott and Floyd Mutrux
 A Christmas Carol – adaptation by Tom Wood, based on the book by Charles Dickens
 Fortune Falls - by Jonathan Christensen
 Disgraced - by Ayad Akhtar
 Crazy for You - music and lyrics by George Gershwin and Ira Gershwin, book by Ken Ludwig 
 Peter and the Starcatcher - stage adaptation by Rick Elice, based on the novel by Dave Barry and Ridley Pearson 
 Sense and Sensibility - adapted by Tom Wood from novel by Jane Austen

2017-2018 
 Shakespeare in Love - based on the Screenplay by Marc Norman and Tom Stoppard, adapted for the stage by Lee Hall
 Hadestown - by Anaïs Mitchell, developed with and directed by Rachel Chavkin
 The Humans - by Stephen Karam
 Empire of the Sun - by Tetsuro Shigematsu
 A Christmas Carol – adaptation by Tom Wood, based on the book by Charles Dickens
 Children of God - by Corey Payette
 Silver Arrow - by Mieko Ouchi
 Ubuntu: The Capetown Project - by D. Cloran, M.Grootboom, D.Hay, D. Jansen, H. Lewis, M. Monteith, and A. Nebulane
 Mamma Mia! - Music & lyrics by Benny Andersson and Björn Ulvaeus with Some songs Stig Anderson, Book by Catherine Johnson 
 Undercover - by Rebecca Northan with Bruce Horak

2018-2019 
 Once - by Enda Walsh
 Redpatch - by Raes Calvert and Sean Harris Oliver
 Miss Bennet: Christmas at Pemberley - by Margot Melcon and Lauren Gunderson
 A Christmas Carol – adaptation by Tom Wood, based on the book by Charles Dickens
 Sweat  - by Lynn Nottage
 Matilda the Musical -  Written by Dennis Kelly and Tim Minchin, based on the book by Roald Dahl
 The Candidate - by Kat Sandler
 The Party- by Kat Sandler (played in repertory with The Candidate)
 The Tempest -by William Shakespeare

2019-2020 

 Six - by Toby Marlow and Lucy Moss

Productions have been suspended due to the Coronavirus Pandemic as of March 2020

References

External links
Citadel Theatre
Theatre History

Canadian theatre company production histories
Theatre in Edmonton